This is a list of events in Scottish television from 1956.

Events
Unknown - Between 1956 and 1965, Radio Free Scotland is broadcast through the sound channel of BBC One Scotland after the channel closes down for the evening.
Unknown - The ITV franchise for Central Scotland franchise is awarded to Scottish Television from three applications.

Births
11 January - Phyllis Logan, actress
25 October - John Michie, film and television actor
28 November - Fiona Armstrong, television journalist
Unknown - Colin MacDonald, radio and television writer
23 November - Jonathan Watson, actor

See also
1956 in Scotland

 
Television in Scotland by year
1950s in Scottish television